Hormiguero is the Spanish word for anthill.  It may refer to:
 Hormiguero, Arizona, one of the 19th century Gila River Pima Villages.
El Hormiguero, a popular Spanish television program that airs on Antena 3.
Hormigueros, Puerto Rico, a municipality located in the western region of the island.
An area of Cienfuegos, Cuba.
Hormiguero, Mexico an Archeological site associated with the Maya civilization of pre-Columbian Mesoamerica.
Hormiguero, Nicaragua (also referred to as El Hormiguero), a small village in northeastern Nicaragua.